Ronald Anscombe (1908–1973) was a British cinematographer. After working as a camera operator on a number of films for ABPC at Welwyn Studios such as The Dark Eyes of London (1939) he was promoted to cinematographer, working mainly on documentaries.

Selected filmography

Cinematographer
 Tower of Terror (1941)
 Suspected Person (1942)

Camera Operator
 The Dark Eyes of London (1939)
 East of Piccadilly (1941)
 Banana Ridge (1942)
 Warn That Man (1943)
 Women Aren't Angels (1943)
 The Man from Morocco (1945)

References

Bibliography
 Johnson, Tom. Censored Screams: The British Ban on Hollywood Horror in the Thirties. McFarland, 2006.

External links

1908 births
1973 deaths
Film people from London
British cinematographers